The Martin Cemetery is a historic cemetery on the northern frontage road of Interstate 30 in the Mabelvale section of southwestern Little Rock, Arkansas. The cemetery's oldest burials date to 1833, and consist of members of the Martin family, early settlers and surveyors of the area. The oldest portion of the cemetery, a  rectangular area located in its southeast, was listed on the National Register of Historic Places in 2017, for its association with the region's early history.

See also

National Register of Historic Places listings in Little Rock, Arkansas

References

External links
 

Buildings and structures completed in 1863
Cemeteries in Little Rock, Arkansas
Cemeteries on the National Register of Historic Places in Arkansas
Georgian architecture in Arkansas
National Register of Historic Places in Little Rock, Arkansas
Victorian architecture in Arkansas
Historic districts on the National Register of Historic Places in Arkansas
Cemeteries established in the 1830s